Naked is a short musical film directed by Sean Robinson and written by VP Boyle. It is based on the song "Without a Stitch On" by Mike Pettry, and was first shown at the Rhode Island International Film Festival in 2013. It stars Katie Zaffrann.

Reception
 Parma International Music Film Festival: Best Song (won-2013)
 Long Island International Film Expo: Best Original Song (won-2013)
 Chain NYC Film Festival: Best Musical Short (won-2013)
 Snake Alley Festival of Film: Best Comedy (nominated-2013)

Film Threat gave the film 3 stars.

References

External links
 

2013 films
2010s musical films
2010s English-language films